Thyrocopa seminatella is a moth of the family Xyloryctidae. It was first described by Lord Walsingham in 1907. It is endemic to the Hawaiian island of Kauai.

The length of the forewings is 10–14 mm. Adults are on wing year round. The ground color of the forewings is mottled light brown to brown and blackish brown. The discal area is clouded with poorly defined blackish spots in the cell. There is a curving poorly defined whitish band through the terminal area and evenly spaced spots on the distal half of the costa and along the termen at the vein endings. The hindwings are light brown, with spots on the termen and the anal margin at the vein endings. The fringe is minimal.

External links

Thyrocopa
Endemic moths of Hawaii
Moths described in 1907